The Circus Princess (German: Die Zirkusprinzessin) is a 1925 German silent film directed by Adolf Gärtner and starring Josefine Dora, Olga Engl and Johanna Ewald. It is based on the operetta Die Zirkusprinzessin. Another German silent film adaptation was released in 1929.

The film's sets were designed by the art director Carl Ludwig Kirmse.

Cast
In alphabetical order
 Josefine Dora 
 Olga Engl 
 Johanna Ewald 
 Cilly Feindt 
 Angelo Ferrari
 Robert Garrison 
 Rudolf Klein-Rhoden
 Rudolf Lettinger
 Clementine Plessner 
 Otto Reinwald 
 Alexandra Sorina 
 Hans Trautner 
 Bruno Ziener

References

Bibliography
 Kurt Gänzl, Andrew Lamb. Gänzl's book of the musical theatre. Schirmer Books, 1989.

External links

1925 films
Films of the Weimar Republic
Films directed by Adolf Gärtner
German silent feature films
Films based on operettas
Circus films
German black-and-white films